Pir Mishan (also Romanized as Pīr Mīshān; also known as Pīr Meshān and Pirmashān) is a village in Jowkar Rural District, Jowkar District, Malayer County, Hamadan Province, Iran. At the 2006 census, its population was 104, in 27 families.

References 

Populated places in Malayer County